Jeffrey Thomas Bianchi (born October 5, 1986) is an American former professional baseball shortstop and current hitting coach for the Lancaster Barnstormers of the Atlantic League of Professional Baseball. He appeared in Major League Baseball (MLB) for the Milwaukee Brewers and the Boston Red Sox.

Bianchi attended Lampeter-Strasburg High School in Lampeter, Pennsylvania. He was drafted in the second round (50th overall) of the 2005 MLB draft by the Kansas City Royals. He was a Topps Short-season/ Rookie All-Star.

Career

Kansas City Royals
In 2008, Bianchi won the Frank White award for being the best defensive player in the Royals minor league system while playing for the Wilmington Blue Rocks.

Bianchi was added to the Royals' 40-man roster following the 2009 season to protect him from the Rule 5 draft.

In March 2010 Bianchi underwent Tommy John elbow surgery, sidelining him for the 2010 season. Bianchi returned in 2011 and appeared in 119 games for the Northwest Arkansas Naturals, hitting .259. After the 2011 season, he was designated for assignment.

Milwaukee Brewers
The Chicago Cubs claimed him off waivers on December 9, 2011, but on January 11, 2012 they designated him for assignment and he was claimed by the Milwaukee Brewers.

Bianchi was recalled by the Brewers on August 22 when Randy Wolf was released.

Bianchi played for the Brewers in 2013 and has played a range of positions such as shortstop, second base, and third base. On May 24, 2014, he was outrighted off the 40-man roster. He was called back up on June 29, 2014. Bianchi declined a minor league assignment on October 12 and became a free agent.

Boston Red Sox
On January 11, 2015, Bianchi signed a minor league deal with the Red Sox. On May 24, 2015, Bianchi was called up to the Red Sox when they placed Shane Victorino on the 15-day DL. He was designated for assignment on May 28 and re-signed with the team three days later. Bianchi was re-designated on June 15. He was reassigned to the minors, and was granted free agency on October 5.

Colorado Rockies
On April 1, 2016, Bianchi signed a minor league deal with the Colorado Rockies organization. He became a free agent on November 7, 2016.

Coaching career
After the 2016 season, Bianchi joined the Milwaukee Brewers as a scout, and remained in that position through the 2020 season. On March 16, 2021, Bianchi was named hitting coach for the Lancaster Barnstormers of the Atlantic League of Professional Baseball for the 2021 season. Bianchi also served as an assistant coach for alma mater Lampeter-Strasburg High School during the Spring 2021 season.

References

External links

1986 births
Living people
American people of Italian descent
Arizona League Royals players
Baseball players at the 2015 Pan American Games
Baseball players from Pennsylvania
Boston Red Sox players
Burlington Bees players
Huntsville Stars players
Major League Baseball infielders
Milwaukee Brewers players
Nashville Sounds players
Northwest Arkansas Naturals players
Pan American Games medalists in baseball
Pan American Games silver medalists for the United States
Pawtucket Red Sox players
Sportspeople from Lancaster, Pennsylvania
Surprise Rafters players
United States national baseball team players
West Oahu Canefires players
Wilmington Blue Rocks players
Medalists at the 2015 Pan American Games